Wonderful World! is a 1981 album by The Kelly Family. The album includes traditional Virginia melodies such as the "New Britain" melody to "Amazing Grace", published in the 1831 collection Virginia Harmony.

Information 
After Lieder der Welt, Kellys' label, Polydor, offered Dan "Papa" Kelly a solo contract for his star, young John Kelly. An offer promptly refused by Papa Kelly. Suddenly, Kelly Family's contract with Polydor expired in 1980. Papa Kelly feels happy because he wanted his children to feel free. Papa Kelly started then his personal label, called KEL-Life.

Production began for two albums, Wonderful World! and Christmas for All. Caroline left the band (and soon the family too) in 1980 after the recordings of Kelly Family Loves Christmas and You, though she very briefly took part in the early recordings of Wonderful World!.

Nine members took part in the album; Papa and Mama Kelly and siblings Kathy, Paul, John, Patricia, Jimmy, Joey and Barby. This is the first album where Barby has lead vocals and the last where Mama Kelly took part, as she'll die of breast cancer in 1982. The family immediately moved to Spain after finishing producing the album.

All the songs were arranged by Kathy Kelly and Willeem Poot and two of them (Txiki and Lonely) are credited as written by Kathy.

Videoclips were made in Germany, Italy and in Spain featuring all members, Paddy and Maite, but without Caroline (with the exception of Ave Maria where also Angelo is present). Many of them were released in A Long Time Ago with Mom, others in The Complete Story and Christmas for All.

There are two versions known of the track What a Wonderful World. The first is the official version from 1981 with John and Joey on the lead vocals and the 1984 version with Paddy and Joey, released on another version of the album. The 1984 version is one of the five songs known from the Eric Barclay era (along with Une Famille c'est une Chanson, Didelidei, Ein Familie ist Ein Wield and Hiroshima, I'm Sorry).

Two Double-A singles were released from this album: the first is Old McDonald / Amazing Grace released in 1984 and the other We Love the Pope / Our Father in 1986.

Track listing

Partial Credits

The Kelly Family 
Dan "Papa" Kelly – Lead vocals (Tracks 1, 3-4, 6-8, 10-11, 13), producer
Barbara-Ann "Mama" Kelly – Lead vocals (Track 1)
Caroline Kelly – background vocals (Track 3), accordion
Kathy Kelly – Lead vocals (Tracks 1, 5, 7, 13), violin, accordion, guitar, arrangements
Paul Kelly – Lead vocals (Tracks 5, 10), violin, flute, saxophone
John Kelly – Lead vocals (Tracks 3-9, 11-12), bombo, percussions
Patricia Kelly – Lead vocals (Tracks 5, 7, 10, 13), guitar
Jimmy Kelly – Lead vocals (Tracks 5, 10)
Joey Kelly – Lead vocals (Tracks 5, 9-10)
Barby Kelly – Lead vocals (Track 5)

References

1981 albums
The Kelly Family albums